is Japanese attorney-at-law (a counsel of TMI Associates) and was a member of the Supreme Court of Japan.

References

Supreme Court of Japan justices
1939 births
Living people